The 2012 President's Cup Women's doubles was a professional tennis tournament played on outdoor hard courts in Astana, Kazakhstan.

Vitalia Diatchenko and Galina Voskoboeva were the defending champions, but both chose not to participate.

Oksana Kalashnikova and Marta Sirotkina won the title, defeating Lyudmyla Kichenok and Nadiya Kichenok 3–6, 6–4, [10–2] in the final.

Seeds

Draw

Draw

References
 Main Draw

President's Cup (tennis) - Doubles